Shosha Goren (born 1943 in Baghdad, Iraq) is an Israeli actress and comedian of Iraqi Jewish descent.
She immigrated to Israel in 1951. While on a visit to the United States, she abandoned her position as teacher of Hebrew Literature and Language and went on to pursue her acting career at Brooklyn College in New York. However, in 1980, she returned to Israel with her family.

She also starred in the 2007 Israeli film Jellyfish alongside Sarah Adler.

She is married to Yitzhak Goren, an Egyptian Jewish writer and director.

References

External links

1943 births
Living people
Iraqi Jews
People from Baghdad
Iraqi emigrants to Israel
Israeli Jews
Israeli stage actresses
Israeli film actresses
Brooklyn College alumni
20th-century Israeli actresses
21st-century Israeli actresses